The 1989–90 Maltese Premier League was the 10th season of the Maltese Premier League, and the 75th season of top-tier football in Malta. It was contested by 9 teams, and Valletta F.C. won the championship.

League standings

Third Place tie-breaker
With both Hibernians and Hamrun Spartans level on 23 points, a play-off match was conducted to qualification for the UEFA Cup

Results

References
Malta - List of final tables (RSSSF)

Maltese Premier League seasons
Malta
1989–90 in Maltese football